Reunited may refer to:

Music
Reunited Tour, a 2004 concert tour by Judas Priest

Albums
Reunited (Gaither Vocal Band album), 2009
Reunited (Gloria Jones album), 1982
Reunited (Highway 101 album), 1996
Reunited (The Jets album), 2014
Reunited (Mafikizolo album), 2013
Reunited – Cliff Richard and The Shadows, 2014

Songs
"Reunited" (song), by Peaches & Herb, 1979
"Reunited", by Wu-Tang Clan from Wu-Tang Forever, 1997
"Reunited", a track from the soundtrack of the 2015 video game Undertale by Toby Fox

Television
Reunited (New Zealand TV series), a 2022 New Zealand documentary series
Reunited (TV pilot), a 2010 British television pilot
Reunited (American TV series), a 1998 American sitcom
Reunited: The Real World Las Vegas, a 2007 American reality series
"Reunited" (Steven Universe), an episode

See also
Reunited National Party (Herenigde Nasionale Party), a 1940s South African political party
Reunited with Jimmy Webb 1974–1988, a 1999 album by Glen Campbell